Colin Fraser Barron  (20 September 1893 – 15 August 1958) was a Canadian recipient of the Victoria Cross, the highest and most prestigious award for gallantry in the face of the enemy that can be awarded to British and Commonwealth forces.

He was born at Boyndie, Banffshire, Scotland, a son of Margaret Walker Barron, a domestic servant. He was raised in a large household by his grandparents Joseph Barron & Mary (née Reid) Barron along with his brother Alexander Barron and many other half-siblings and aunts and uncles. He emigrated to Canada in 1910, and enlisted in the Canadian Expeditionary Force in 1914.

Barron was 24 years old, and a Corporal in the 3rd (Toronto) Battalion, CEF during the First World War when  he was awarded the Victoria Cross. On 6 November 1917 at the Second Battle of Passchendaele, Belgium, when his unit was held up by three machine-guns, Corporal Barron opened fire on them at point-blank range, rushed the guns, killed four of the crew and captured the remainder. He then turned one of the captured guns on the retiring enemy, causing severe casualties. This action produced far-reaching results and enabled the advance to continue.

He later achieved the rank of sergeant-major, and during the Second World War he served with the Royal Regiment of Canada. He is buried in Veteran's Section 7, grave 3562 at Prospect Cemetery, Toronto, Ontario, Canada.

References

Further reading 
Monuments to Courage (David Harvey, 1999)
The Register of the Victoria Cross (This England, 1997)
Scotland's Forgotten Valour (Graham Ross, 1995)
VCs of the First World War - Passchendaele 1917 (Stephen Snelling, 1998)

External links
 Colin Barron digitized personnel file 
 Legion Magazine Article on Colin Barron
 Colin Fraser Barron profile on the Directorate of History and Heritage (DND)

 

Canadian World War I recipients of the Victoria Cross
1893 births
1958 deaths
People from Banff and Buchan
Scottish emigrants to Canada
Canadian Expeditionary Force soldiers
Queen's Own Rifles of Canada soldiers
Canadian Army personnel of World War II
Canadian Army soldiers
Canadian military personnel of World War I
Royal Regiment of Canada
Royal Regiment of Canada soldiers
Scottish military personnel
Burials in Ontario